Style Icon Asia (SIA, formerly known as Style Icon Awards) is an awards ceremony held annually in South Korea since 2008 to showcase Asian fashion designers and to honor individuals who have made the most outstanding contributions in setting new paradigms and trends in fashion, broadcasting, culture and arts.

Awards

2008
The first awards ceremony was held on October 30, 2008 at Club Answer in Cheongdam-dong.

2009
The second awards ceremony was held on November 11, 2009 at N Seoul Tower.

2010
The third awards ceremony was held on November 17, 2010 at the CJ E&M Center in Seoul.

2011
The fourth awards ceremony was held on November 3, 2011 at the CJ E&M Center in Seoul.

2012
The fifth awards ceremony was held on October 25, 2012 at the CJ E&M Center in Seoul.

2013
The sixth awards ceremony was held on October 24, 2013 at the CJ E&M Center in Seoul.

2014
The seventh awards ceremony was held on October 28, 2014 at Dongdaemun Design Plaza. It was hosted by Jang Yoon-ju and Jung Joon-young.

2016
The eighth awards ceremony was held on March 15, 2016 at Dongdaemun Design Plaza. It was hosted by Leeteuk, Eric Nam and Hwang Jae-keun.

See also
 List of fashion awards

References

External links
 

Awards established in 2008
Awards disestablished in 2016
CJ E&M
Fashion awards